Angela Margaret Thirkell (30 January 1890 – 29 January 1961) was an English and Australian novelist. She also published one novel, Trooper to Southern Cross, under the pseudonym Leslie Parker.

Early life
She was the elder daughter of John William Mackail (1859–1945), a Scottish classical scholar and civil servant from the Isle of Bute who was the Oxford Professor of Poetry from 1906 to 1911. Her mother was Margaret Burne-Jones, daughter of the Pre-Raphaelite painter Edward Burne-Jones, and through her, Thirkell was the first cousin once removed of Rudyard Kipling and Stanley Baldwin. Her brother, Denis Mackail (1892–1971), was also a novelist and they had a younger sister, Clare. The three Mackail children were, in their youth, treated first-hand to the fairytales of Mary De Morgan.

Angela Mackail was educated in London at Claude Montefiore's Froebel Institute, then at St Paul's Girls' School, Hammersmith, and in Paris at a finishing school for young ladies.

Marriages and children
Soon after her return from Paris, Angela Mackail met James Campbell McInnes (1874–1945), a professional singer, and married him in 1911. Their first son was born in January 1912 and named Graham after McInnes's former lover, Graham Peel. He became a diplomat and writer. Their second son was the novelist Colin MacInnes. A third child, Mary, was born and died in 1917, and Angela then divorced her husband for adultery, in a blaze of publicity.

In December 1918, Angela married George Lancelot Allnut Thirkell (1890–c. 1940), an engineer of her own age originally from Tasmania, and in 1920 they sailed for Australia together with her sons. However, the Thirkells led a 'middle-middle-class life' in Melbourne, which to Angela was all deeply unfamiliar and repugnant. Their son Lancelot George Thirkell, later Comptroller of the BBC, was born there, but, in November 1929, Angela left her husband without warning, returning to England on the pretext of a holiday, but in fact quitting Australia for good.
Lacking  money, she begged the fare to London from her godfather, J. M. Barrie, and used the sum intended for her return ticket for two single passages, for herself and her youngest son. She claimed that her parents were ageing, and needed her, but she certainly also preferred the more comfortable life available with them in London. Her second son, Colin, followed her to England soon after, but Graham stayed in Melbourne.

Thereafter, her "attitude to any man whom she attracted was summed up in the remark: 'It's very peaceful with no husbands,'" which was quoted by the Observer newspaper in its column 'Sayings of the Week'.

Writing career
Thirkell began writing early in her life in Australia, chiefly through the need for money. An article appeared in the Cornhill Magazine in November 1921 and was the first of many articles and short stories, including work for Australian radio. On her return to England in 1929, this career continued with journalism, stories for children, and then novels. Her success as a novelist began with her second novel, High Rising (1933). She set most of her novels in Anthony Trollope's Barsetshire, his fictional English county developed in the six novels known as the Chronicles of Barsetshire. An alert reader of contemporary fiction, Thirkell also borrowed freely from little known titles like John Galsworthy's The Country House, from which, for example, she lifted the name 'Worsted' which she used for the village setting of her novel August Folly (1936). She also quoted frequently, without attribution, from novels by Charles Dickens, William Thackeray and Elizabeth Gaskell. Thirkell published a new novel every year, which she referred to in correspondence with her editor, Jamie Hamilton of Hamish Hamilton, as new wine in an old bottle. She professed horror at the idea that her circle of well educated and upper-middle-class friends might read her fiction: she expected them to prefer, as she did, such writers as Gibbon, Austen, Dickens and Proust. She drew the epigraph to T 1951 from Proust: "Les gens du monde se représentent volontiers les livres comme une espèce de cube dont une face est enlevée, si bien que l'auteur se dépêche de 'faire entrer' dedans les personnes qu'il rencontre" ("Society people think that books are a sort of cube, one side of which the author opens the better to insert into it the people he meets.")

Her books of the 1930s in particular had a satiric exuberance, as in Pomfret Towers, which sends up village ways, aristocratic folly and middle-class aspirations. Three Houses (1931, Oxford University Press; repeatedly reprinted) is a short childhood memoir which simultaneously displays Thirkell's precociously finished style, her lifelong melancholy, and her idolisation of her grandfather, Edward Burne-Jones. Trooper to the Southern Cross (1934; republished in 1939 as What Happened on the Boat) "is concerned with the experiences of a number of English and Australian passengers aboard a troop-ship, the Rudolstadt, on their way back to Australia immediately after World War I. It is particularly interesting for its depiction of the Australian 'digger'; his anti-authoritarianism, larrikinism, and, at the same time, his loyalty to those whom he respects".

In the 1940s, her work was coloured by the war. The home front figured particularly in Cheerfulness Breaks In (1940), showing how women saw their loved ones off to the front and Northbridge Rectory, which showed how housewives coped with the annoyances of wartime life. These books include Marling Hall, Growing Up and The Headmistress and provide a vibrant picture of the attitude, struggle and resigned good cheer, of British women during the war. Even a book which did not deal exclusively with the war effort, Miss Bunting, addressed changes in society the war had wrought, as the title character, a governess, grows to middle age and wonders how to live out her life and where her ambitions might take her as the world turns upside down. These books provide a time capsule of the age.

Later books in the 1950s became more romantic and less contemporary. Among these, The Old Bank House in particular shows Thirkell concerned with the rise of the merchant class, her prejudices evident but giving way to grudging respect for industriousness and goodhearted generosity. Later books are simpler romances. The romance The Duke's Daughter deals in a way more directly than some of her others with descendants of Trollope's Barsetshire characters. Her final book, Three Score and Ten, was left unfinished at her death but was completed later by C. A. Lejeune. Thirkell showed a keen social sense and a lively eye for the telling detail of everyday life. Many of her books remain in print.

Selected books

Barsetshire Chronicles

 High Rising (1933)
 Wild Strawberries (1934)
 The Demon in the House (1934)
 August Folly (1936)
 Summer Half (1937)
 Pomfret Towers (1938)
 The Brandons (1939)
 Before Lunch (1939/1940)
 Cheerfulness Breaks In (1940)
 Northbridge Rectory (1941)
 Marling Hall (1942)
 Growing Up (1943)
 The Headmistress (1944)
 Miss Bunting (1945)
 Peace Breaks Out (1946)
 Private Enterprise (1947)
 Love Among the Ruins (1948)
 The Old Bank House  (1949)
 County Chronicle (1950)
 The Duke's Daughter (1951)
 Happy Returns (1952)
 Jutland Cottage (1953)
 What Did It Mean? (1954)
 Enter Sir Robert (1955)
 Never Too Late (1956)
 A Double Affair (1957)
 Close Quarters (1958)
 Love at All Ages (1959)
 Three Score and Ten (1961)

Other books

 Ankle Deep (1931)
 Three Houses (1931); 
 Trooper to the Southern Cross (1934; republished as What Happened on the Boat)
 O These Men, These Men! (1935)
 The Grateful Sparrow (1935)
 The Fortunes of Harriet (1936)
 Coronation Summer (1937)

References

Further reading
 Margaret Bird, Dear Mrs Bird from Old Mrs T: The Letters of Angela Thirkell to Margaret Bird 1950–1960 (The Angela Thirkell Society, 2002).
 Barbara Burrell, Angela Thirkell's World: A Complete Guide to the People and Places of Barsetshire .
 Laura Roberts Collins, English Country Life in the Barsetshire Novels of Angela Thirkell (Praeger, 1994).
 Mary Faraci, The Many Faces and Voices of Angela Thirkell: A Literary Examination of the Brotherton Collection (The Angela Thirkell Society of North America, 2013).
 Penelope Fritzer, Aesthetics and Nostalgia in the Barsetshire Novels of Angela Thirkell (The Angela Thirkell Society of North America, 2009).  
 Penelope Fritzer, editor, Character and Concept in the Barsetshire Novels of Angela Thirkell (The Angela Thirkell Society of North America, 2005). 
 Penelope Fritzer, Ethnicity and Gender in the Barsetshire Novels of Angela Thirkell (Greenwood Press, 1999).
 Anne Hall: Angela Thirkell : a writer's life, London : Unicorn, 2021, 
 Tony Gould, Inside Outsider: The Life and Times of Colin MacInnes (Penguin, 1983). A well-written and extremely informative biography of Thirkell's second son, the novelist Colin MacInnes.
 Hermione Lee, "Good Show: Why Do So Many Readers Seek Refuge in Angela Thirkell's Little England?", New Yorker, 7 October 1996, Vol. 72 Issue 30.
 Jill Levin, The Land of Lost Content (M.A. thesis, Washington University, 1986): a sympathetic interpretation of Thirkell's novels and her psychology.
 D. M. McFarlan, Delicious Prose: A Study of the Barsetshire Novels of Angela Thirkell (The Angela Thirkell Society, 2008).
 Cynthia Snowden, Going to Barsetshire: A Companion to the Barsetshire Novels of Angela Thirkell (Morris Publishing, 2000).  
 Margot Strickland, Angela Thirkell: Portrait of a Lady Novelist (Gerald Duckworth & Co. Ltd, 1977). Unfortunately the only biography of Thirkell in existence, it is available from the author via the UK Angela Thirkell Society. The author received full cooperation from Thirkell's youngest son Lance. Both factually and tonally, her contempt for Thirkell's work is evident.

External links 

 
 
 The Angela Thirkell Society in the UK
 The Angela Thirkell Society in North America

1890 births
1961 deaths
English people of Scottish descent
People educated at St Paul's Girls' School
20th-century English novelists
20th-century Australian short story writers
19th-century Australian women
20th-century Australian women
Burne-Jones family